The 1956 United States presidential election in Indiana took place on November 6, 1956, as part of the 1956 United States presidential election. State voters chose 13 representatives, or electors, to the Electoral College, who voted for president and vice president.

Indiana was won by incumbent President Dwight D. Eisenhower (R–Pennsylvania), running with Vice President Richard Nixon, with 59.90% of the popular vote, against Adlai Stevenson (D–Illinois), running with Senator Estes Kefauver, with 39.70% of the popular vote.

This is the last time a Republican won Lake County while not being able to win all of the counties (Nixon won Lake County while winning every county in Indiana in 1972.)

Results

Results by county

See also
 United States presidential elections in Indiana

Note

References

Indiana
1956
1956 Indiana elections